Ugo Humbert was the defending champion but chose not to defend his title.

Nicola Kuhn won the title after defeating Pavel Kotov 6–2, 7–6(7–4) in the final.

Seeds
All seeds receive a bye into the second round.

Draw

Finals

Top half

Section 1

Section 2

Bottom half

Section 3

Section 4

References

External links
Main Draw
Qualifying Draw

Men's Singles